The Elite 11 is a quarterback competition for high school quarterbacks across the United States. Elite 11 was founded in 1999 by Andy Bark and continues to be run by his company, Student Sports Inc, hosted at the Nike World Headquarters in Beaverton, Oregon.

Over the years, 12–24 of the nation's top quarterbacks have been selected to attend the Elite 11 Finals from 6 to 8 regional competitions held across the country, where over 400 quarterbacks compete and are evaluated.

Prior to 2012, the Elite 11 Finals were held across various sites in Southern California. Since 2013, the Elite 11 has been held at Nike World Headquarters in Beaverton, Oregon in conjunction with The Opening. The top 11–12 QB's are split into teams from a pool of 162 players of different positions in a flag football tournament and long ball challenges, which is the same as a throw-off in flag football, but it is from the pylon to wherever the ball lands.

The head coach of the Elite 11 is Trent Dilfer, assisted by Jordan Palmer, George Whitfield Jr., Adam Tafralis, Charlie Frye, Craig Nall and Matt James. The General Manager and President is Student Sports' Brian Stumpf.

Notable Elite 11 Finals alumni include Andrew Luck, Trevor Lawrence, Matthew Stafford, Jameis Winston, Teddy Bridgewater, Matt Leinart, Geno Smith, Mark Sanchez, Tim Tebow, Vince Young, Kyle Orton,  Justin Fields, and Troy Smith. Since 2016, the camp has been covered by NFL Network in a YouTube series.

History of Elite 11

1999

2000

2001

2002

2003

2004

2005

2006

2007

2008

2009

2010

2011

2012

2013

2014

Source:

2015

2016

2017

2018

2019
D. J. Uiagalelei was selected to the 2019 Elite 11 finals but he could not participate because of overlapping obligations to his high school team (St. John Bosco High School) so they selected C. J. Stroud instead, who ended up as the 2019 Elite 11 MVP.

2020

2021

2022

2023

References

External links
 http://www.elite11.com/
 https://www.elite11.com/history

Lists of college football players